San Felipe District is one of twelve districts of the province Jaén in Peru.

References